Loving in Stereo is the third studio album by British electronic band Jungle, released on 13 August 2021. It is their first release on their own independent label, Caiola Records, and is marketed and distributed by AWAL (a division of Sony Music).

Loving in Stereo was released three years after their second studio album, For Ever (2018), and is the group's first release to include featured artists, with guest appearances from American rapper Bas and Swiss-Tamil musician Priya Ragu respectively. The album was preceded by five singles: "Keep Moving", "Talk About It", "Romeo", "Truth", and "All of the Time".

Background
Loving in Stereo comes three years after the band's second studio album, For Ever (2018). The album additionally marks the first time that Jungle have included featured collaborations on a release, with American rapper Bas and Swiss-Tamil musician Priya Ragu, respectively.

Composition
The album as a whole discusses themes of "new beginnings, new love and fighting back against the odds". In an interview discussing the album, frontman Josh Lloyd-Watson stated:"When we write music there's hope. Maybe today we'll create something that influences people and changes the way they feel. If you can make something that lifts people, that's an amazing feeling."

Release
On 16 March 2021, Jungle premiered a trailer titled Loving in Stereo featuring a vignette of the dancers regularly associated with the collective from previous videos, performing in an abandoned compound or prison. At the time of the trailer's release, it was unclear whether the title was in reference to an upcoming album or a single. On 22 March, the duo confirmed Loving in Stereo would serve as the title of their third studio album, by way of the announcement of the album's first single, "Keep Moving" which premiered via Annie Mac's BBC Radio 1's Hottest Record in the World program on 23 March 2021. Loving in Stereo was released on 13 August 2021 through the group's own independent imprint, Caiola Records. It was made available on CD, LP, digital download, and streaming formats. A blue marbled edition of the album was additionally made available in selected international JB Hi-Fi stores.

Critical reception

At Metacritic, which assigns a normalized rating out of 100 to reviews from professional publications, Loving in Stereo received an average score of 81 based on 11 reviews, indicating "universal acclaim".

Promotion

Singles
"Keep Moving" was released on 23 March 2021 as the album's lead single. It was premiered on Annie Mac's Hottest Record in the World program on BBC Radio 1.

"Talk About It" was released on 2 June 2021 as the second single. It was premiered the same way as its predecessor, on Annie Mac's Hottest Record in the World program.

"Romeo", featuring American rapper Bas, was released on 6 July 2021 as the third single. "Romeo" marked the duo's first single with a featured artist.

Tour
Alongside the album's announcement, the band additionally released details of an upcoming worldwide tour, scheduled to begin in September 2021.

Track listing
All tracks are produced by J Lloyd, except "Can't Stop the Stars", produced by J Lloyd and Tom McFarland.

Notes
 "Romeo" incorporates an interpolation of "I Love You More", written by Ronald McCoy and performed by Lee Williams & the Cymbals.

Personnel

Jungle
 Josh Lloyd-Watson – writing, vocals, executive production, engineering, mixing , arrangement, creative direction, cover design, guitar , bass , keys & synths , drum programming , vibraphone , organs , drums 

 Tom McFarland – writing, vocals, production, executive production, engineering, mixing , arrangement, keys & synths , drum programming 

Additional musicians
 Andro Cowperthwaite – vocals 
 George Day – writing, drums 
 Lydia Kitto – writing, vocals , bass , synths 
 Rudi Salmon – vocals 
 Andreya Triana – vocals 
 Dominic Whalley – writing, bass, piano, drums, percussion 
 Bas – writing, vocals 
 Priya Ragu – writing, vocals 
 Corrine Bailey – french horn 
 Nick Barr – viola 
 Luke Bowman – guitar 
 Rossetta Carr – vocals 
 Meghan Cassidy – viola 
 Stephanie Cavey – violin  
 Miranda Chambers – vocals 
 Dean "Inflo" Josiah Cover – writing , production , vocals , drums 
 Rosie Danvers – string arrangement, cello , brass arrangement 
 Louis Dowdeswell – trumpet 
 Tim Ellis – french horn 
 Zehra Güler – vocals 
 Laurence Hammerton – writing, guitar 
 Fergus Ireland – bass 
 Sally Jackson – violin 
 Bryony James – cello 
 Patrick Kiernan – violin 
 Mike Lovatt – trumpet 
 Trevor Mires – trombone 
 Phillip Morris – french horn 
 Rae Morris – vocals 
 Steve Morris – violin 
 Hayley Pomfrett – violin 
 Kotono Sato – violin 
 Sara Sexton – violin 
 Ellie Stanford – violin 
 Dave Stewart – trombone 
 Holly Taylor – vocals 
 Jamie Lloyd-Taylor – writing, production  guitar, bass , drum programming , vocals 
 Chloe Vincent – flute 
 Junior Williams – vocals 
 Martin Williams – flute , saxophone , brass arrangement 
 Andrew Wyatt – writing, bass, piano 

Technical personnel
 Barni Barnicott – mixing 
 Matt Colton – mastering
 Chloe Kraemer – engineering assistant
 Ben Loveland – engineering
 Luke Pickering – engineering 
 Charlie Di Placido – creative director, executive production
 Tucan – mixing 
 Sam Denniston – management
 Tom Sandford – graphic design

Charts

Release history

References

2021 albums
Jungle (band) albums
Albums produced by Jungle (band)
AWAL albums
Albums produced by Inflo